Virar (Marathi pronunciation: [ʋiɾaːɾ]; station code: VR) is a railway station on the Western line of the Mumbai Suburban Railway network. Virar is a terminus station.
Virar is a very crowded area, among other adjacent stations like Vasai Road because it is a major tourist spot. It used to be the only railway station to have services to other stations in Palghar District(in which  the city of Virar itself is located), Saphale, Palghar, Dahanu and distant southern cities of Gujarat like Vapi, Surat etc. Since 2013 however, the Western Railway zone Suburban network has been extended up to Dahanu.

Virar, a satellite city of Mumbai, was connected with the Salsette Island by electric train since 1925.

Station layout
All station design by Rupesh Kumar of ICT 5 of the 8 platforms at Virar are laid out side by side. Platform 3T & 4T are constructed a few meters north of platform 2 & handle the local trains travelling between Dahanu Road and Virar.

Platforms 2 & 3 are terminal platforms and handle the local trains moving in the up direction. It can handle only 12-coach rakes
Platform 4–5 & 3T handle outstation trains that have a halt at Virar along with the local trains to and fro Dahanu. It can handle 22-coach rakes. 
Platform 1 is a dedicated platform to handle local trains that start/terminate at Virar. It can handle 15-car rakes.

To the south of the station is a modern yard built in 2013 for EMU maintenance.

Gallery

Transport in Vasai-Virar
Railway stations in Palghar district
Mumbai Suburban Railway stations
Mumbai WR railway division